Harold V. Jones II (born August 1, 1969) is an American politician who has served in the Georgia State Senate from the 22nd district since 2015.

References

External links
 Profile at the Georgia State Senate

1969 births
Living people
Democratic Party Georgia (U.S. state) state senators
21st-century American politicians
African-American Catholics